Tan or TAN may refer to:

Businesses and organisations
 Black and Tans, a nickname for British special constables during the Irish War of Independence. By extension "Tans" can now also colloquially refer to English or British people in general, especially disparagingly.
 TAN Books, a Catholic publishing company
 FC Rubin-TAN Kazan, a Russian professional ice hockey club in Kazan in 1991-94
 Transportes Aereos Nacionales, an airline based in Honduras known as TAN Airlines

People
 Tan (surname) (譚), a Chinese surname
 Chen (surname) (陳), a Chinese surname, pronounced "Tan" in Min Nan languages
 Laozi, posthumous name "Tan" or "Dān" (聃), philosopher of ancient China
 Leborgne, nicknamed Tan, a patient of Paul Broca's, on whose autopsy he identified Broca's area
 TAN (musician) (born 1990), Malaysian pop singer
 Tan Sağtürk (born 1969), Turkish ballet

Places

China
 Tan (state), an ancient viscountcy in eastern Shandong Province, China
 Tai'an railway station (Shandong), China Railway pinyin code TAN

Vietnam
 Tân An, Bắc Giang Province, a northeastern commune and village
 Tân An, Long An Province, the capital city of Long An Province, Mekong Delta
 Tân An Province, a former province of South Vietnam

Elsewhere
 Tan Track, also known as "The Tan", a running track in Royal Botanic Gardens, Melbourne, Australia
 Tanzania (IOC and FIFA trigram: TAN), a country
 Taunton Municipal Airport (IATA airport code: TAN), in Taunton, Massachusetts, US

Science and technology
 Tan (color), a pale shade of brown
 Tanning (leather), the process of making leather from hides
 Tangent (tan), one of the trigonometric functions
 Ti-6Al-7Nb, a titanium alloy containing aluminum and niobium
 Total acid number, or TAN, the measure of a lubricant's or crude oil's acidity
 Transaction authentication number or TAN, in electronic banking

Biology
 Tan (goat pattern), a goat color pattern
 Tanbark, or tan, the bark of certain species of tree
 Sun tanning, the darkening of skin in response to ultraviolet light
 Sunless tanning, the darkening of skin without ultraviolet light
 Tropical ataxic neuropathy

Other uses
 -tan, a Japanese honorific
 Tan, an album by the Polish rock band Kult
 TAN (group), South Korean boy band
 Tan (newspaper), a newspaper in Turkey
 Tan (weekly newspaper), a newspaper in Kosovo 
 Irish War of Independence, sometimes called the "Black and Tan war" or "Tan war"
 Tahn (Armenian  tʻan), a yoghurt-based drink from the Middle East
 Tanfana, or Tan, an ancient European goddess
 Tax Deduction and Collection Account Number (TAN), an Indian tax code
 TAN, marketing name for Semitan, operates public transport in Nantes, France

See also
 Dan (disambiguation) (Tan is the older romanization of Dan in Chinese)
 Tannin (disambiguation)
 Tanning (disambiguation)
 TANS (disambiguation)
 Tanzhou (disambiguation), a Chinese placename originally meaning "Tan District" and now meaning "Tan City"